Mitromica africana is a species of small sea snail, marine gastropod mollusk in the family Costellariidae, the ribbed miters.

Description

Distribution
This marine species occurs off Angola.

References

 Rolán E. & Fernandes F., 1996. Thala africana sp. nov. (Gastropoda, Costellariidae) new species for the West African coasts. Argonauta 9(7–9): 19–22.
 Rosenberg, G. & Salisbury, R. 2003. On Mitromica and Thala (Gastropoda: Costellariidae) with descriptions of new species from the Western Atlantic and Indo-Pacific. Notulae Naturae 478: 1–30

Costellariidae
Gastropods described in 1996